Anuj Sachdeva (born 5 October 1986) is an Indian actor and model. Sachdeva has worked in fims, television commercials and TV shows. He participated in the reality show MTV Roadies in 2005. Sachdeva is known for his role of Amrit in Sabki Laadli Bebo.  He was seen portraying the role of Sahil Sengupta in Colors popular show Swaragini - Jodein Rishton Ke Sur.

He has acted in films such as Hawaa Hawaai; a romantic comedy, Love Shagun and two Punjabi films; Haani and Police in Pollywood.

Personal life
Anuj Sachdeva was born in Delhi. Before his acting career took off, Sachdeva was working with his father in his business of manufacturing shoes. He is a qualified shoe designer as well. He began his modeling and acting career on his father's insistence.

Sachdeva has also done a course in method acting from Lee Strasberg Theatre and Film Institute.

Career

Sachdeva appeared on Season 3 of the reality show MTV Roadies.  After Roadies, he formally began his acting career with a cameo in a 2007 Hindi film Delhii Heights.

He enrolled himself for the Grasim Mr. India pageant. Sachdeva was bestowed with trophies of Mr. Photogenic and Best Talent. His modelling career took off from here on and he appeared in many commercials.

Sachdeva debuted on television with Star Plus' Sabki Laadli Bebo. He later appeared in Zee TV's Phir Subah Hogi where he played the role of Thakur Aditya Singh, the male protagonist with a feisty attitude. Sachdeva quit the show later that year expressing dislike for the script. He then moved to New York for a few months to pursue a course in Method Acting at Lee Strasberg Theatre & Film Institute. Sachdeva joined Sony TV's Chhanchhan in 2013 as a replacement for Farhan Khan. Sachdeva was signed on by Rajan Shahi as the male protagonist of his show Itti Si Khushi on Sony TV. He was then seen as Sahil Sengupta in Rashmi Sharma Telefilms Limited Swaragini - Jodein Rishton Ke Sur on Colors TV.

Sachdeva appeared at Kaun Banega Crorepati alongside his Itti Si Khushi co-star Smriti Kalra.

In 2019, Sachdeva took part in dance reality show Nach Baliye on Star Plus along with Urvashi Dholakia.

It was reported that, he was about to play a cameo role in Jai Hanuman - Sankat Mochan Naam Tiharo, but later on declined it.

Filmography

Television

Films
2007 Delhii Heights
2013 Haani as Harman
2014 Hawaa Hawaai as Bugs
2014 Police in Pollywood
2016 Love Shagun as Jyotiraditya Suryakant Dubey/JD

Web series

Breathe as Sameer
Bin Bulaye Mehmaan
The Reunion as Dev

References

External links

1982 births
Living people
Male actors from Delhi
Indian male soap opera actors
Male actors in Hindi cinema